Eoghan Ó Donnghaile (Owen O'Donnelly) (fl. c. 1690) was an Irish poet.

Eugene O'Curry wrote of Ó Donnghaile in his Manners and Customs , saying that:

"About 1680 a controversy sprang up among some of the bards of Ulster as to what race by ancient right belonged the armorial bearing of Ulster – the Red Hand – belonged. Eoghan Ó Donnghaile took part in the controversy and claimed the Red Hand for the O'Neills of Tyrone."

Robin Flower believed that Ó Donnghaile was a member of the bardic family that had fostered Séan 'an díomais' Ó Néill (Shane O'Neill), and there is a lament for Shane – Ceist ar eolchibh iath Éireann/A question for the learned of Ireland ... – attributed to Ó Donnghaile. Shane's fosterage among the Ó Donnghailes of Ballydonnelly, County Tyrone, led to him being known as Shane Ó Donnghaileach.

Seosamh Ó Dufaigh held that he may be identical with the Eoghan Ó Donnghaile listed on the 1704 registration of clergy for the parish of Armagh, a priest, the author of Comhairle Mhic Clámha, and Mo choin do theacht Fheidhlime ... Ó Dufaigh sees the latter as salutation to his kinsman, Pádraig Ó Donnghaile, aka Feilim Brady, The Bard of Armagh.

Ó Donnghaile is the author of:

 Ceist ar eolchibh iath Éireann/A question for the learned of Ireland ...
 Trom na gartha sa a Leith Chuinn/Sad these shouts, oh Leith Chuinn ..., a lament.
 Tuirseach damh aig eirghe lae/Woeful to me the rising of the day ...
 Is nar an sgelsa teachd da thigh/Bad is the new that came to your house ..., a reply to Dermod mac Lewis Mac an Bhaird.

Ó Donnghaile is ascribed as author of:

 Mo choin do theacht Fheidhlime/Welome to you Feilimidh ...
 Comhairle Mhic Clámha/MacClave's Advice

References
 O'Reilly (1820), A Chronological Account of Nearly Four Hundred Irish Writers, Dublin.
 Eugene O'Curry (1873), Manners and Customs of the Ancient Irish, Dublin. 
 C. O'Rahilly (1925), Tóruigheach Gruaidhe Griansholus, London. 
 Robin Flower (1926), Catalogue of Irish Manuscripts in the British Museum, volume 11
 Seosamh Ó Dufaigh & B. Rainey (1981), Comhairle Mhic Clamha o Achadh na Muilleann, Lille, pp. 24–42.
 Diarmaid Ó Doibhlin (2000), Tyrone's Gaelic Literary Legacy, pp. 414–417, op.cit.

17th-century Irish writers
18th-century Irish writers
Irish poets
Irish-language poets
17th-century Irish poets